William Hugh Shaw (3 November 1872 – 2 February 1938) was an Australian rules footballer who played with St Kilda and Melbourne in the Victorian Football League (VFL).

Shaw was already a 100-game veteran for St Kilda when he made his VFL debut, having played for the club in the Victorian Football Association. He was St Kilda's inaugural VFL captain, leading the club in 1897 and 1898. A wingman, he experienced losses in each of his 29 league games for St Kilda and even lost the only fixture he played with Melbourne, which he joined in 1901.

References

External links 

 

1872 births
Australian rules footballers from Melbourne
St Kilda Football Club players
Melbourne Football Club players
1938 deaths
People from St Kilda, Victoria